This is a list of the butterflies of India belonging to the family Lycaenidae and an index to the species articles. This forms part of the full List of butterflies of India.

This list is based on Evans (1932) and includes 318 species belonging to 76–128 genera depending on taxonomy.

Subfamily Poritiinae

Genus Poritia – gems
 Blue gem, Poritia erycinoides (C. Felder & R. Felder, 1865)
 Common gem, Poritia hewitsoni Moore, 1865
 Green gem, Poritia pleurata Hewitson, 1874
 Poritia phama H. Druce, 1895

Genus Simiskina – brilliants
 Broad-banded brilliant, Simiskina phalena (Hewitson, 1874) (article Poritia phalena as per LepIndex)

Subfamily Miletinae

Genus Miletus – brownies
 Bigg's brownie, Miletus biggsii (Distant, 1884)
 Common brownie, Miletus boisduvali Moore, 1857
 Common brownie, Miletus chinensis C. Felder, 1862
 Long's brownie, Miletus longeana (de Nicéville, 1898)
 Great brownie, Miletus symethus (Cramer, 1777)

Genus Allotinus – darkies
 Crenulate darkie, Allotinus drumila (Moore, 1865) Moore (L4.1)
 Common darkie, Allotinus horsfieldii (Moore, 1857) (L4.3)
 Angled darkie, Allotinus fabius (Distant, 1887)
 Blue darkie, Allotinus subviolaceus Felder, 1865
 Great darkie, Allotinus multistrigatus de Nicéville, 1886(Note: To be merged with Allotinus drumila)

Genus Logania – mottles
 Watson's mottle, Logania watsoniana de Nicéville, 1898 (L5.1)
 Dark mottle, Logania distanti Semper, 1891 = Logania massalia Doherty, 1891 (L5.2)

Genus Spalgis – apefly
 Apefly, Spalgis epius (Westwood, 1851) (L6.1)

Genus Taraka – forest Pierrot
 Forest Pierrot, Taraka hamada H. Druce, 1875 (L7.1)

Genus Liphyra – moth butterfly
 Moth butterfly, Liphyra brassolis Westwood, 1864 (L76.1)

Subfamily Curetinae

Genus Curetis – sunbeams

 Indian sunbeam, Curetis thetis (Drury, 1773) (L40.1)
 Burmese sunbeam, Curetis saronis Moore, 1877 (L40.2)
 Bright sunbeam, Curetis bulis Westwood, [1851] (L40.3)
 Angled sunbeam, Curetis acuta Moore, 1877 (L40.4)
 Shiva's sunbeam, Curetis siva Evans, 1954
 Toothed sunbeam, Curetis dentata Moore, 1879

Subfamily Polyommatinae

Genus Talicada – red Pierrot
 Red Pierrot, Talicada nyseus Guérin, 1843 (L8.1)

Genus Castalius – common Pierrot
 Common Pierrot, Castalius rosimon Fabricius, 1775 (L9.1)
 Dark Pierrot, Castalius ananda de Nicéville, 1884 previously Tarucus ananda de Nicéville (L10.1)

Genus Caleta – angled Pierrot
 Angled Pierrot, Caleta caleta (Hewitson, 1876) previously Castalius caleta Moore (L9.2)

Genus Discolampa – banded blue Pierrot
 Banded blue Pierrot, Discolampa ethion Westwood, 1851 previously Castalius ethion Doubleday & Hewitson (L9.3)

Genus Pycnophallium – Pierrots
 Elbowed Pierrot, Pycnophallium elna (Hewitson, 1876) previously Castalius elna Frühstorfer (L9.4) also classified as Caleta elna
 Straight Pierrot, Pycnophallium roxus (Godart, 1823) previously Castalius roxus Godart (L9.5) also classified as Caleta roxus

Genus Tarucus – blue Pierrots
 Assam Pierrot, Tarucus dharta Bethune-Baker, 1918 (L10.2)
 Himalayan Pierrot, Tarucus venosus Moore, 1882 (L10.3)
 Spotted Pierrot, Tarucus callinara Butler, 1886 (L10.4)
 Pointed Pierrot, Tarucus theophrastus Fabricius, 1793 (L10.5)
 Rounded Pierrot, Tarucus extricatus Butler, 1886 (L10.6)
 Rusty Pierrot, Tarucus alteratus Moore, 1882 (L10.7)
 Spotted Pierrot, Tarucus nigra Bethune-Baker, 1918 (L10.8)
 Striped Pierrot, Tarucus nara Kollar, 1848 (L10.9)
 Indian Pierrot, Tarucus indica Evans, 1932
 Balkan Pierrot, Tarucus balkanicus (Freyer, 1845)

Genus Syntarucus – zebra blue
 Zebra blue, Syntarucus plinius (Fabricius, 1793) (L11.1) (synonyms Leptotus plinius, Tarucus plinius)

Genus Azanus – babul blues

 Bright babul blue, Azanus ubaldus Cramer, 1782 (L12.1)
 Dull babul blue, Azanus uranus Butler, 1886 (L12.2)
 Siam babul blue, Azanus urios Riley & Godfrey, 1921 (L12.3)
 African babul blue, Azanus jesous Guérin-Méneville, 1847 (L12.4)

Genus Niphanda – pointed Pierrots
 Pointed Pierrot, Niphanda cymbia de Nicéville, 1884 (L13.1)

Genus Pithecops – forest Quakers
 Blue Quaker, Pithecops fulgens Doherty, 1889 (L14.1)
 Forest Quaker, Pithecops hylax Horsfield, 1828 (L14.2)

Genus Neopithecops – Quaker
 Quaker, Neopithecops zalmora Butler, 1870 (L15.1)

Genus Elkalyce – tailed Cupids
 Tailed Cupid, Elkalyce argiades (Pallas, 1771) previously Everes argiades Evans (L16.1) 
 Chapman's Cupid, Elkalyce diporides (Chapman, 1909) previously Everes diporides Chapman (L16.2) 
 Black Cupid, Elkalyce kala (de Nicéville, 1890) previously Everes kala de Nicéville (L16.5)

Genus Shijimia – Moore's Cupid 
 Moore's Cupid, Shijimia moorei (Leech, 1889) previously Everes moorei Leech (L16.6)

Genus Bothrinia – hedge Cupid
 Hedge Cupid, Bothrinia chennelli (de Nicéville, 1884) (L17.1)

Genus Megisba – Malayan
 Malayan, Megisba malaya (Horsfield, 1828) (H20.1, pg 220)

Genus Callenya
 Tiny hedge blue, Callenya melaena (Doherty, 1889) (L19.5)

Genus Lestranicus
 White-banded hedge blue, Lestranicus transpectus (Moore, 1879) (L19.8)

Genus Celatoxia
 Whitedisc hedge blue, Celatoxia albidisca (Moore, [1884]) (L19.6)
 Margined hedge blue, Celatoxia marginata (de Nicéville, 1884) (L19.7)

Genus Celastrina – hedge blues
 Metallic hedge blue, Celastrina melaena (Doherty, 1889) previously Lycaenopsis melaena Rhe Phil (L19.4)
 Albocerulean, Celastrina albocoeruleus (Moore, 1879) previously Lycaenopsis albocoerulea Moore (L19.11)
 Swinhoe's hedge blue, Celastrina musina (Snellen, 1892) previously Lycaenopsis musina Swinhoe (L19.14)
 Plain hedge blue, Celastrina lavendularis (Moore, 1877) previously Lycaenopsis lavendularis Moore (L19.15)
 Pale hedge blue, Celastrina cardia (Felder, 1860) previously Lycaenopsis cardia Moore (L19.16)
 Large hedge blue, Celastrina huegeli (Moore, 1882) previously Lycaenopsis huegelii Moore (L19.18)
 Silvery hedge blue, Celastrina ladonides (De L'Orza, 1869) previously Lycaenopsis ladonides Hemming (L19.19)
Celastrina gigas, Hemming, 1828
 Hill hedge blue, Celastrina argiolus (Linnaeus, 1758) previously Lycaenopsis argiolus Woodmason (L19.20)
 Jyntea hedge blue, Celastrina iynteana (de Nicéville, 1883) previously Lycaenopsis jynteana de Nicéville (L19.21)
 Dusky blue Cupid, Celastrina dipora (Moore, 1865) previously Everes dipora Moore (L16.3)

Genus Acytolepis – hedge blues
 Common hedge blue, Acytolepis puspa (Horsfield, 1828) previously Lycaenopsis puspa Toxopeus (L19.1)
 Hampson's hedge blue, Acytolepis lilacea (Hampson, 1889) Lycaenopsis lilacea Hampson (L19.2)

Genus Oreolyce – hedge blues
 Naga hedge blue, Oreolyce quadriplaga (Snellen, 1892) previously Lycaenopsis quadriplaga Tytler (L19.3)
 Dusky hedge blue, Oreolyce vardhana (Moore, 1874) previously Lycaenopsis vardhana Moore (L19.9)

Genus Akasinula – white hedge blue
 White hedge blue, Akasinula akasa (Horsfield, 1828) previously Lycaenopsis akasa Frühstorfer (L19.10)

Genus Notarthinus – Chapman's hedge blue
 Chapman's hedge blue, Notarthinus binghami Chapman, 1908 previously Lycaenopsis binghami Chapman (L19.17)

Genus Udara – hedge blues
 Singhalese hedge blue, Udara singalensis (Felder, 1868) (L19.13)
 Prized hedge blue, Udara dilecta Moore, 1879
 Ceylon hedge blue, Udara lanka Moore, 1877 previously Lycaenopsis lanka Moore and Polyommatus lanka (L19.12)

Genus Phengaris – great spotted blue
 Great spotted blue, Phengaris atroguttata (Oberthür 1876) previously Polyommatus atroguttata Oberthür (L20.1)

Genus Pseudophilotes – chequered blue
 Chequered blue, Pseudophilotes vicrama (Moore, 1865) previously Polyommatus vicrama Staudinger (L20.2)

Genus Polyommatus – meadow blues
 Polyommatus stoliczkana (C. & R. Felder, [1865])
 Polyommatus dux Riley, 1926
 Polyommatus pseuderos Moore, 1879
 Polyommatus ariana Moore, 1865

Genus Agriades
 Agriades arcaseia (Fruhstorfer, 1916)
 Azure mountain blue, Agriades asiatica (Elwes, 1882) (L20.8)
 Agriades lehanus (Moore, 1878)
 Agriades pharis (Fawcett, 1903)
 Greenish mountain blue, Agriades jaloka (Moore, 1875) (L20.13)

Genus Eumedonia
 Chumbi argus, Eumedonia annulata (Elwes, 1906) (L20.6)
 Eumedonia astorica (Evans, 1925)

Genus Plebejidea
 Large jewel blue, Plebejidea loewii (Zeller, 1847) (L20.4)

Genus Aricia
 Orange-bordered argus, Aricia agestis (Denis & Schiffermüller, 1775) (L20.5)

Genus Alpherakya
 Brilliant meadow blue, Alpherakya sarta (Alphéraky, 1881) (L20.14)
 Dusky meadow blue, Alpherakya devanica (Moore, [1875]) (L20.15)

Genus Plebejus
 Plebejus samudra (Moore, [1875]) (L20.3)

Genus Patricius
 Chumbi green underwing, Patricius younghusbandi (Elwes, 1906) (L20.9)

Genus Pamiria
 Dusky green underwing, Pamiria omphisa (Moore, [1875]) (L20.10)
 Small green underwing, Pamiria metallica (C. & R. Felder, [1865]) (L20.11)
 Pamiria chrysopis (Grum-Grshimailo, 1888)
 Large green underwing, Pamiria galathea (Blanchard, [1844]) (L20.12)

Genus Freyeria – grass jewel
 Grass jewel, Freyeria trochylus (Freyer, 1845) previously Zizeeria trochilus Freyer (L22.1)

Genus Luthrodes – Cupids

 Plains Cupid, Luthrodes pandava (Horsfield, 1829) (L23.3)
 Small Cupid, Luthrodes contracta (Butler, 1880) (L23.2)

Genus Chilades – lime blue
 Lime blue, Chilades lajus (Stoll, [1780]) (L21.1)
 Indian Cupid, Chilades parrhasius (Fabricius, 1793) previously Everes parrhasius Fabricius (L16.4)

Genus Zizeeria – grass blues
 Dark grass blue, Zizeeria karsandra Moore, 1865 (L22.3) previously Z. lysimon, mistakenly previously pre-occupied
 Lesser grass blue, Zizeeria otis (Fabricius, 1787) (L22.5)

Genus Pseudozizeeria – pale grass blue
 Pale grass blue, Pseudozizeeria maha (Kollar, 1848) previously Zizeeria maha Kollar (L22.2)

Genus Zizula – tiny grass blue
 Tiny grass blue, Zizula gaika (Trimen, 1862) previously Zizula gaika Trimen; synonym Zizula hylax (Fabricius 1775) (now suppressed) (L22.4)

Genus Euchrysops – gram blues
 Gram blue, Euchrysops cnejus (Fabricius, 1798) (L23.1)

Genus Anthene – ciliate blues
 Ciliate blue, Anthene emolus (Godart, 1823) previously Lycaenesthes emolus Godart (L24.1)
 Pointed ciliate blue, Anthene lycaenina (C. Felder, 1868) previously Lycaenesthes lycaenina Felder (L24.2)

Genus Catochrysops – forget-me-nots
 Forget-me-not, Catochrysops strabo (Fabricius, 1793) (L25.1)
 Silver forget-me-not, Catochrysops lithargyria Doherty, 1891 (L25.2)
 Silver forget-me-not, Catochrysops panormus (C. Felder, 1860)

Genus Lampides – ceruleans and the peablue
 Peablue, Lampides boeticus (Linnaeus, 1767) (L26.1)

Genus Jamides – ceruleans
 Dark cerulean, Jamides bochus Stoll, 1782 (L27.1)
 White cerulean, Jamides cleodus (Felder, 1865) (L27.2)
 Common cerulean, Jamides celeno (Cramer, 1775) (L27.3)
 Milky cerulean, Jamides lacteata (de Nicéville, 1895) (L27.4)
 Ferrar's cerulean, Jamides ferrari Evans, 1932 (L27.5)
 Glistening cerulean, Jamides kankena (Felder 1862) (L27.6)
 Metallic cerulean, Jamides alecto (Felder, 1860) (L27.7)
 Royal cerulean, Jamides caerulea (Druce, 1873) previously Jamides coerulea Druce (L27.8)

Genus Orthomiella – straightwing blue
 Straightwing blue, Orthomiella pontis (Elwes, 1887) (L28.1)

Genus Una – una
 Una, Una usta (Distant, 1886) (L29.1)

Genus Nacaduba – lineblues
 White lineblue, Nacaduba angusta (Druce, 1873) (L30.1)
 Large four-line blue, Nacaduba pactolus (Felder, 1860) (L30.2)
 Pale four-line blue, Nacaduba hermus (Felder 1860) (L30.3)
 Small four-line blue, Nacaduba pavana (Horsfield, 1828) (L30.5)
 Pointed lineblue, Nacaduba helicon Felder (no date) (L30.7)
 Transparent six-line blue, Nacaduba kurava (Moore, 1857) (L30.8)
 Opaque six-line blue, Nacaduba beroe (Felder & Felder, 1865) (L30.9)
 Rounded six-line blue, Nacaduba berenice (Herrich-Schäffer, 1869) (L30.10)
 Bhutya lineblue, Nacaduba bhutea de Nicéville (L30.12) no entry in LepIndex
 Dark Ceylon six-line blue, Nacaduba calauria (C. Felder, 1860)

Genus Catapyrops – Felder's lineblue
 Felder's lineblue, Catapyrops ancyra (Felder, 1860) previously Nacaduba ancyra Elwes (L30.6)

Genus Prosotas – lineblues
 Banded lineblue, Prosotas aluta (Druce, 1873) previously Nacaduba aluta, Nacaduba nora (L30.11)
 Common lineblue, Prosotas nora (Felder, 1860) previously Nacaduba nora Felder (L30.13)
 Tailless lineblue, Prosotas dubiosa (Semper, 1879) previously Nacaduba dubiosa Evans (L30.14)
 White-tipped lineblue, Prosotas noreia (Felder, 1868) previously Nacaduba noreia Felder (L30.15)
 Prosotas dilata (Evans, 1932) previously Nacaduba dilata Evans
 Prosotas pia Toxopeus, 1929 (from FUNET site)
 Bhutya lineblue, Prosotas bhutea (de Nicéville, 1884) previously Nacaduba bhutea (L30.12) (from FUNET site)
 Prosotas lutea (Martin, 1895) (from FUNET site)

Genus Petrelaea – dingy lineblue
 Dingy lineblue, Petrelaea dana (de Nicéville, 1884) previously Nacaduba dana de Nicéville (L30.16)

Subfamily Lycaeninae

Genus Lycaena – coppers
 White-bordered copper, Lycaena pavana Kollar, 1848 (L31.1)
 Common copper, Lycaena phlaeas (Linnaeus, 1761) (L31.2)
 Golden copper, Lycaena thetis Klug, 1834 (L31.3)
 Green copper, Lycaena kasyapa (Moore, 1865) (L31.4)

Genus Heliophorus – sapphires

 Sorrel sapphire, Heliophorus sena (Kollar, 1844) (L32.1)
 Purple sapphire, Heliophorus epicles Godart, 1823 (L32.2)
 Naga sapphire, Heliophorus kohimensis (Tytler, 1912) (L32.3)
 Western blue sapphire, Heliophorus bakeri Evans, 1927 (L32.4)
 Eastern blue sapphire, Heliophorus oda (Hewitson 1865) (L32.5)
 Golden sapphire, Heliophorus brahma (Moore, 1857) (L32.6)
 Hybrid sapphire, Heliophorus hybrida (Tytler, 1912) (L32.7)
 Green sapphire, Heliophorus androcles (Westwood, 1851) (L32.8)
 Powdery green sapphire, Heliophorus tamu (Kollar, 1848) (L32.9)

Subfamily Theclinae

Genus Strymon – white-line hairstreaks
 White-line hairstreak, Superflua sassanides (Kollar, 1850) previously Strymon sassanides Kollar (L34.1)
 Mackwood's hairstreak, Strymon mackwoodi Evans (L34.2)

Genus Pamela – Lister's hairstreak
 Lister's hairstreak, Pamela dudgeonii (de Nicéville, 1895) previously Listeria dudgeoni de Nicéville (L35.1)

Genus Euaspa – water hairstreak
 Water hairstreak, Euaspa milionia (Hewitson, 1869) (L36.1)

Genus Thecla – hairstreaks
 Peacock hairstreak, Thecla pavo (de Nicéville, 1887) (L37.3)
 Watson's hairstreak, Thecla letha (Watson, 1896) (L37.5)
 White-spotted hairstreak, Thecla ziha (Hewitson, 1865) (L37.18)
 Ferruginous hairstreak, Thecla leechii de Nicéville, 1892 previously Callophrys leechii de Nicéville (L33.1)
 Plumbeous hairstreak, Thecla chalybeia (Leech, 1890) previously Callophrys chalybeia Leech (L33.2)

Genus Esakiozephyrus – hairstreaks
 Dull-green hairstreak, Esakiozephyrus icana (Moore, 1874) previously Thecla icana Moore (L37.1)
 Indian purple hairstreak, Esakiozephyrus bieti (Oberthür, 1886) previously Thecla bieti de Nicéville (L37.2)

Genus Chrysozephyrus – hairstreaks
 Wonderful hairstreak, Chrysozephyrus ataxus (Westwood, 1851) previously Thecla ataxus Doubleday (L37.4)
 Cerulean hairstreak, Chrysozephyrus surioia (Tytler, 1915) previously Thecla surioia Tytler (L37.6)
 Tytler's hairstreak, Chrysozephyrus vittata (Tytler, 1915) previously Thecla vittata Tytler (L37.7)
 Metallic green hairstreak, Chrysozephyrus duma (Hewitson, 1869) previously Thecla duma Hewitson (L37.8)
 Powdered green hairstreak, Chrysozephyrus zoa (de Nicéville, 1889) previously Thecla zoa de Nicéville (L37.9)
 Kabru hairstreak, Chrysozephyrus kabrua (Tytler, 1915) previously Thecla kabrua Tytler (L37.11)
 Fawn hairstreak, Chrysozephyrus birupa (Moore, 1877) previously Thecla birupa Moore (L37.12)
 Jakama hairstreak, Chrysozephyrus jakamensis (Tytler, 1915) previously Thecla jakamensis Tytler (L37.13)
 Silver hairstreak, Chrysozephyrus syla (Kollar, 1848) previously Thecla syla Kollar (L37.14)
 Kirbari hairstreak, Chrysozephyrus kirbariensis (Tytler, 1915) previously Thecla kirbariensis Tytler (L37.15)
 Paona hairstreak, Chrysozephyrus paona (Tytler, 1915) previously Thecla paona Tytler (L37.16)
 Tailless metallic green hairstreak, Chrysozephyrus khasia (de Nicéville, 1890) previously Thecla khasia de Nicéville (L37.17)

Genus Teratozephyrus – Suroifui hairstreak
 Suroifui hairstreak, Teratozephyrus doni (Tytler, 1915) previously Thecla doni Tytler (L37.10)

Genus Chaetoprocta – walnut blue
 Walnut blue, Chaetoprocta odata (Hewitson, 1865) (L38.1)

Genus Amblopala – Chinese hairstreak
 Chinese hairstreak, Amblopala avidiena Hewitson, 1877 (L39.1)

Genus Iraota – silverstreak blues
 Silverstreak blue, Iraota timoleon Stoll, 1790 (L41.1)
 Scarce silverstreak, Iraota rochana Horsfield, 1829 (L41.2)

Genus Horsfieldia – leaf blue
 Purple leaf blue, Horsfieldia anita Moore (L42.1)???

Genus Thaduka – many-tailed oak-blue
 Many-tailed oak-blue, Thaduka multicaudata Moore, 1878 (L43.1)

Genus Mahathala – falcate oakblue
 Falcate oakblue, Mahathala ameria (Hewitson, 1862) (L44.1)

Genus Apporasa – crenulate oakblue
 Crenulate oakblue, Apporasa atkinsoni (Hewitson, 1869) previously Mahathala atkinsoni Hewitson (L44.2)

Genus Amblypodia – oakblues
 Tytler's rosy oakblue, Amblypodia suffusa Tytler, 1915 (L45.4)
 Sylhet oakblue, Amblypodia silhetensis Hewitson, 1862 (L45.5)
 Singapore oakblue, Amblypodia yendava Grose-Smith, 1887 (L45.6)
 Purple-glazed oakblue, Amblypodia agaba Hewitson, 1862 (L45.12)
 Silky oakblue, Amblypodia alax Evans, 1932 (L45.15)
 Glazed oakblue, Amblypodia paralea Evans, 1925 (L45.17)
 Pallid oakblue, Amblypodia alesia Felder, 1865 (L45.24)
 Pale Himalayan oakblue, Amblypodia dodonaea Moore, 1857 (L45.25)
 Dark Himalayan oakblue, Amblypodia rama (Kollar, 1848) (L45.26)
 Plain plushblue, Amblypodia apidanus Doherty (L45.42) Flos apidanus (?)
 Tailless plushblue, Amblypodia areste Hewitson, 1862 (L45.46)

Genus Arhopala – oakblues
 Magnificent oakblue, Arhopala anarte (Hewitson 1862) previously Amblypodia anarte Hewitson (L45.1)
 Lilac oakblue, Arhopala camdeo (Moore, 1857) previously Amblypodia camdeo Moore (L45.3)
 Tytler's dull oakblue, Arhopala ace de Nicéville, 1892 previously Amblypodia ace Tytler (L45.7)
 de Nicéville's oakblue, Arhopala agrata de Nicéville, 1890 previously Amblypodia agrata de Nicéville (L45.8)
 Hewitson's oakblue, Arhopala oenea (Hewitson, 1869) previously Amblypodia aenea Hewitson (L45.9)
 Doherty's oakblue, Arhopala khamti Doherty, 1891 previously Amblypodia khamti Doherty (L45.10)
 Indian oakblue, Arhopala alemon (de Nicéville, 1891) previously Amblypodia alemon de Nicéville (L45.14)
 Large oakblue, Arhopala amantes (Hewitson, 1862) previously Amblypodia amantes Hewitson (L45.18)
 Powdered oakblue, Arhopala bazalus (Hewitson, 1862) previously Amblypodia bazalus Hewitson (L45.20)
 Green oakblue, Arhopala eumolphus (Cramer, 1782) previously Amblypodia eumolphus (L45.21)
 Ormiston's oakblue, Arhopala ormistoni Riley, 1920 previously Amblypodia ormistoni (L45.22)
 Comic oakblue, Arhopala comica de Nicéville, 1900 previously Amblypodia comica (L45.27)
 Hooked oakblue, Arhopala paramuta (de Nicéville, 1884) previously Amblypodia paramuta (L45.28)
 Plain tailless oakblue, Arhopala asopia (Hewitson, 1869) previously Amblypodia asopia (L45.29)
 Andaman tailless oakblue, Arhopala zeta (Moore, 1877) previously Amblypodia zeta (L45.30)
 Purple brown tailless oakblue, Arhopala arvina (Hewitson 1869) previously Amblypodia arvina (L45.31)
 Malayan bushblue, Arhopala ammon (Hewitson, 1862) previously Amblypodia ammon (L45.35)
 Burmese bushblue, Arhopala birmana (Moore, 1883) previously Amblypodia birmana (L45.36)
 Ellis's bushblue, Arhopala ellisi Evans, 1914 previously Amblypodia ellisi (L45.38)
 Aberrant bushblue, Arhopala abseus (Hewitson, 1862) previously Amblypodia abseus (L45.39)
 Bifid plushblue, Arhopala diardi (Hewitson, 1862) previously Amblypodia diardi (L45.40)
 Shining plushblue, Arhopala fulgida (Hewitson, 1863) previously Amblypodia fulgida (L45.41)
 Chinese plushblue, Arhopala chinensis Felder, 1865 previously Amblypodia chinensis (L45.45)

Genus Nilasera – oakblues
 Opal oakblue, Nilasera opalina Moore, 1883 previously Amblypodia opalina Moore (L45.2)
 Centaur oakblue, Nilasera centaurus (Fabricius, 1775) previously Amblypodia centaurus Moore (L45.16)
 Variegated plushblue, Nilasera adriana de Nicéville, 1884 previously Amblypodia adriana de Nicéville (L45.43)
 Spangled plushblue, Nilasera asoka de Nicéville, 1884 previously Amblypodia asoka de Nicéville (L45.44)
 Spotless oakblue, Narathura fulla (Hewitson, 1862) previously Amblypodia fulla Riley (L45.47)

Genus Panchala – oakblues
 Rosy oakblue, Panchala alea (Hewitson, 1862) previously Amblypodia alea Hewitson (L45.11)
 Kanara oakblue, Panchala canaraica (Moore, 1884) previously Amblypodia canaraica Moore (L45.13)
 Yellowdisc oakblue, Panchala singla (de Nicéville, 1885) previously Amblypodia singla de Nicéville (L45.19)
 Tailless bushblue, Panchala ganesa (Moore, 1857) previously Amblypodia ganesa Moore (L45.33)

Genus Acesina – oakblues
 Dusky bushblue, Acesina paraganesa de Nicéville, 1882 previously Amblypodia paraganesa de Nicéville (L45.34)
 Pale bushblue, Acesina aberrans de Nicéville, 1889 previously Amblypodia aberrans de Nicéville (L45.37)

Genus Narathura – Tamil oakblue
 Tamil oakblue, Narathura bazaloides (Hewitson, 1878) previously Amblypodia bazaloides Hewitson (L45.23)

Genus Darasana – tailless oakblue
 Yellowdisc tailless oakblue, Darasana perimuta (Moore, 1857) previously Amblypodia perimuta Moore (L45.32)

Genus Surendra – acacia blue
 Common acacia blue, Surendra quercetorum (Moore, 1857) (L46.1)

Genus Zinaspa – silver streaked acacia blue
 Silver streaked acacia blue, Zinaspa todara (Moore, 1883) previously Surendra todara Moore (L46.2)

Genus Mota – saffron
 Saffron, Mota massyla (Hewitson, 1869) (L47.1)

Genus Loxura – yamfly
 Yamfly, Loxura atymnus (Cramer, 1782) (L48.1)

Genus Yasoda – branded yamfly
 Branded yamfly, Yasoda tripunctata (Hewitson, 1863) (L49.1)

Genus Drina – brown yamfly
 Brown yamfly, Drina donina (Hewitson, 1865) (L50.1)

Genus Zesius – redspot
 Redspot, Zesius chrysomallus Hübner, 1819/21 (L53.1)

Genus Pratapa – tufted royals
 White royal, Pratapa deva (Moore, 1857) (L54.5)
 Dark blue royal, Pratapa icetas (Hewitson, 1865) (L54.6)

Genus Dacalana – double tufted royal
 Double tufted royal, Dacalana vidura (Horsfield, 1857) previously Pratapa vidura (L54.1)

Genus Ancema – royals
 White-banded royal, Ancema cotys (Hewitson, 1865) previously Pratapa cotys Hewitson (L54.2)
 Bi-spot royal, Ancema ctesia (Hewitson, 1865) previously Pratapa ctesia Hewitson (L54.3)
 Silver royal, Ancema blanka (de Nicéville, 1895) previously Pratapa blanka Evans (L54.4)
 Blue royal, Ancema icetoides (Elwes, 1892) previously Pratapa icetoides de Nicéville (L54.7)
 Uncertain royal, Ancema ister (Hewitson, 1865) previously Tajuria ister Hewitson (L55.5)

Genus Creon – broadtail royal
 Broadtail royal, Creon cleobis (Godart, 1823) previously Pratapa cleobis Godart (L54.8)

Genus Maneca – slate royal
 Slate royal, Maneca bhotea (Moore, 1884) previously Pratapa bhotea Moore (L54.9)

Genus Tajuria – royals
 Chestnut and black royal, Tajuria yajna (Doherty, 1886) (L55.3)
 Pallid royal, Tajuria albiplaga (de Nicéville, 1887) (L55.9)
 Tytler's royal, Tajuria sebonga Tytler, 1915. (L55.10) a valid synonym of T. jalajala pallescens (Druce)
 Dusky royal, Tajuria thyia de Nicéville, 1892 (L55.11)
 Plains blue royal, Tajuria jehana Moore, 1883 (L55.12)
 Peacock royal, Tajuria cippus (Fabricius, 1798) (L55.13)
 Scarce white royal, Tajuria illurgioides de Nicéville, 1890 (L55.15)
 Spotted royal, Tajuria maculata Hewitson (L55.17)

Genus Remelana – chocolate royal
 Chocolate royal, Remelana jangala (Horsfield, 1829) previously Tajuria jangala Moore (L55.1)

Genus Sithon – orange and black royal
 Orange and black royal, Sithon megistia (Hewitson, 1869) previously Tajuria megistia Hewitson (L55.2)

Genus Ops – branded royal
 Branded royal, Ops melastigma (de Nicéville, 1887) previously Tajuria melastigma de Nicéville (L55.4)

Genus Bullis – baby royal
 Baby royal, Bullis buto (de Nicéville, 1895) previously Tajuria buto (L55.6)

Genus Creusa – black-branded royal
 Black-branded royal, Creusa culta de Nicéville, 1896 previously Tajuria culta Hewitson (L55.7)

Genus Iolaus – royals
 Straightline royal, Iolaus diaeus Hewitson, 1865 previously Tajuria diaeus Hewitson (L55.8)
 Chinese royal, Iolaus luculentus Leech, 1890 previously Tajuria luculentus Swinhoe (L55.16)

Genus Cophanta – white royal
 White royal, Cophanta illurgis Hewitson, 1866 previously Tajuria illurgis Hewitson (L55.14)

Genus Charana – mandarin blues
 Banded royal, Charana jalindra Moore (L56.1)????
 Mandarin blue, Charana mandarinus (Hewitson, 1863) (L56.2)
 Cachar mandarin blue, Charana cepheis de Nicéville, 1895 (L56.3)

Genus Neocheritra – pale grand imperial
 Pale grand imperial, Jacoona fabronia (Hewitson, 1878) previously Neocheritra fabronia Hewitson (L57.1)

Genus Suasa – red imperial
 Red imperial, Suasa lisides (Hewitson, 1863) (L58.1)

Genus Cheritrella – truncate imperial
 Truncate imperial, Cheritrella truncipennis de Nicéville, 1887 (L59.1)

Genus Cheritra – common imperial
 Common imperial, Cheritra freja (Fabricius, 1793) (L60.1)

Genus Ticherra – blue imperial
 Blue imperial, Ticherra acte (Moore, 1857) (L61.1)

Genus Biduanda – posies
 Blue posy, Biduanda melisa (Hewitson, 1869) (L62.1)

Genus Rathinda – monkeypuzzle
 Monkeypuzzle, Rathinda amor (Fabricius, 1775) (L63.1)

Genus Horaga – onyxs
 Common onyx, Horaga onyx (Moore, 1857) (L64.1)
 Yellow onyx, Horaga moulmeina Moore, 1883 (L64.2)
 Violet onyx, Horaga albimacula (Wood-Mason & de Nicéville, 1881) (L64.3)
 Brown onyx, Horaga viola Moore, 1882 (L64.4)

Genus Catapaecilma – tinsels
 Common tinsel, Catapaecilma elegans Druce, 1873 (L64.1)
 Yellow tinsel, Catapoecilma subochrea (Elwes, [1893]) (L64.2)

Genus Acupicta – dark tinsel
 Dark tinsel, Acupicta delicatum de Nicéville, 1887 previously Catapoecilma delicatum de Nicéville (L64.3)

Genus Chliaria – tits
 Orchid tit, Chliaria othona (Hewitson, 1865) (L66.1)
 Blue tit, Chliaria kina (Hewitson, 1869) (L66.2)
 Nilgiri tit, Chliaria nilgirica (Moore, 1883) previously Hypolycaena nilgirica Moore (L67.1)

Genus Hypolycaena – tits
 Brown tit, Hypolycaena thecloides (Felder, 1860) (L67.2)
 Common tit, Hypolycaena erylus (Godart, 1823) (L67.3)
 Banded tit, Hypolycaena narada Kunte, 2015

Genus Zeltus – fluffy tit
 Fluffy tit, Zeltus etolus (Fabricius, 1787) (L68.1)

Genus Artipe – green flash
 Green flash, Artipe eryx (Linnaeus, 1771) (L69.1)

Genus Deudorix – cornelians
 Cornelian, Deudorix epijarbas (Moore, 1857) (L70.1)

Genus Virachola – guava blues
 Common guava blue, Virachola isocrates (Fabricius, 1793) (L71.1)
 Large guava blue, Virachola perse (Hewitson, 1863) (L71.2)
 Scarce guava blue, Virachola smilis (Hewitson, ?) (L71.3)

Genus Rapala – flashes
 Rosy flash, Rapala rubida Tytler, 1926 (L72.1)
 Refulgent flash, Rapala refulgens de Nicéville, 1891 (L72.2)
 Suffused flash, Rapala suffusa (Moore, 1878) (L72.4)
 Assam flash, Rapala tara de Nicéville, 1889 (L72.5)
 Brilliant flash, Rapala sphinx Fabricius, 1775 (L72.6)
 Indigo flash, Rapala varuna (Hewitson, 1863) (L72.7)
 Slate flash, Rapala schistacea (Moore, 1879) (L72.8)
 Scarce slate flash, Rapala scintilla de Nicéville, 1890 (L72.9)
 Copper flash, Rapala pheritimus Hewitson (L72.10)
 Scarlet flash, Rapala dieneces (Hewitson, 1878) (L72.11)
 Short flash, Rapala buxaria de Nicéville, 1889 (L72.14)
 Common red flash, Rapala iarbus (Fabricius, 1787) previously Rapala jarbas Fabricius (L72.13)
 Scarce cornelian, Rapala hypargyria Elwes, 1892 previously Deudorix hypargyria Elwes (L70.2)

Genus Vadebra – Malabar flash
 Malabar flash, Vadebra lankana (Moore, 1879) previously Rapala lankana Moore (L72.3)

Genus Baspa – Indian red flash
 Indian red flash, Baspa melampus (Stoll, 1781) previously Rapala melampus (L72.12)

Genus Bidaspa – flashes
 Common flash, Bidaspa nissa (Kollar, 1848) previously Rapala nissa Kollar (L72.15)
 Red Himalayan flash, Bidaspa micans (Bremer & Grey, 1853) previously Rapala micans Moore (L72.16)

Genus Sinthusa – sparks
 Pale spark, Sinthusa virgo (Elwes, 1887) (L73.1)
 Broad spark, Sinthusa chandrana (Moore, 1882) (L73.2)
 Narrow spark, Sinthusa nasaka (Horsfield, 1829) (L73.3)

Genus Bindahara – plane
 Plane, Bindahara phocides (Fabricius, 1793) (L74.1)

Genus Araotes – witch
 Witch, Araotes lapithis (Moore, 1857) (L75.1)

Subfamily Aphnaeinae

Genus Cigaritis – silverlines
 Tawny silverline, Cigaritis acamas (Klug, 1834) (L51.1)
 Common silverline, Cigaritis vulcanus (Fabricius, 1775) (L52.1)
 Elwes' silverline, Cigaritis elwesi (Evans, [1925]) (L52.9)
 Long-banded silverline, Cigaritis lohita (Horsfield, [1829]) (L52.11)
 Plumbeous silverline, Cigaritis schistacea (Moore, [1881]) (L52.2)
 Abnormal silverline, Cigaritis abnormis (Moore, [1884]) (L52.4)
 Common shot silverline, Cigaritis ictis (Hewitson, 1865) (L52.5)
 Scarce shot silverline, Cigaritis elima (Moore, 1877) (L52.6)
 Silvergrey silverline, Cigaritis nipalicus (Moore, 1884) (L52.7)
 Khaki silverline, Cigaritis rukmini (de Nicéville, [1889]) (L52.8)
 Club silverline, Cigaritis syama (Horsfield, [1829]) (L52.10)
 Lilac silverline, Cigaritis lilacinus (Moore, 1884) (L51.2)

See also
Lycaenidae
List of butterflies of India

Cited references

References
Print

 

Online

Lycaenidae
x
B